Vilyuysky District (Bülüü uluuha) is an administrative and municipal district (raion, or ulus), one of the thirty-four in the Sakha Republic, Russia. It is located in the western central part of the republic and borders with Zhigansky District in the northeast, Kobyaysky District in the east, Gorny District in the south, Verkhnevilyuysky District in the west, and with Olenyoksky District in the northwest. Its administrative center is the town of Vilyuysk. Population:  25,696 (2002 Census);  The population of Vilyuysk accounts for 40.6% of the district's total population.

Geography
Main rivers in the district include the Vilyuy and its tributary the Tyung, as well as the Tympylykan, a tributary of the lena.

History
The district was established on January 9, 1930.

Demographics

As of the 1989 Census, the ethnic composition was as follows:
Yakuts: 68.5%
Russians: 22.7%
Evens: 0.2%
Evenks: 0.2%
other ethnicities: 8.4%

Economy
The economy of the district is mostly based on agriculture.

Inhabited localities

Divisional source:

*Administrative centers are shown in bold

References

Notes

Sources

Districts of the Sakha Republic